Luca Cacioli (born 27 March 1982) is a former Italian footballer.

References

External links

1982 births
Living people
Sportspeople from Arezzo
Italian footballers
Alma Juventus Fano 1906 players
A.C. Bellaria Igea Marina players
A.C. Perugia Calcio players
S.S.C. Bari players
Association football defenders
Serie C players
Serie D players
Footballers from Tuscany